Santiaoshi Subdistrict is a subdistrict in southeastern Hongqiao District, Tianjin, China. It shares border with Xigu and Xinkaihe Subdistricts in its north, Hongshunli Subdistrict in its east, Gulou and Jieyuan Subdistricts in its south, and Shaogongzhuang Subdistrict in its west. Its population was 19,255 in 2010.

In 1870, the then Viceroy of Zhili Li Hongzhang paved a local street with 3 rows of limestone for his wife's funeral procession. The area was named Santaioshi as a result.

Geography 
Santiaoshi subdistrict is on the west of the Hai River, and is bypassed by Nanyun River.

History

Administrative divisions 
In the year 2021, Santiaoshi Subdistrict oversaw 8 residential communities. They are listed in the table below:

See also 

 List of township-level divisions of Tianjin

References 

Township-level divisions of Tianjin
Hongqiao District, Tianjin